In comics studies, sequential art is a term proposed by comics artist Will Eisner to describe art forms that use images deployed in a specific order for the purpose of graphic storytelling (i.e., narration of graphic stories) or conveying information. The best-known example of sequential art is comics.

Etymology
The term "sequential art" was coined in 1985 by comics artist Will Eisner in his book Comics and Sequential Art. Eisner analyzed this form into four elements: design, drawing, caricature, and writing.

Scott McCloud, another comics artist, elaborated the explanation further, in his books Understanding Comics (1993) and Reinventing Comics (2000). In Understanding Comics, he notes that the movie roll, before it is being projected, arguably could be seen as a very slow comic.

Related terms include: visual narrative, graphic narrative, pictorial narrative, sequential narrative, sequential pictorial narrative, sequential storytelling, graphic literature, sequential literature, and narrative illustration. The related term sequential sculpture has also been used.

See also
 Bayeux Tapestry
 Biblia pauperum
 Glossary of comics terminology
 Multiliteracy
 Photo comics and photo-romance
 Sequart Organization
 Sequence (filmmaking)
 Trajan's Column
 Visual literacy
 Bande dessinée

References

Comics terminology
Visual arts